The Country Beyond is a 1926 American silent Western film, also classified as a Northern, directed by Irving Cummings and written by Irving Cummings, Ernest Maas, H. H. Caldwell and Katherine Hilliker. It is based on the 1922 novel The Country Beyond by James Oliver Curwood. The film stars Olive Borden, Ralph Graves, Gertrude Astor, J. Farrell MacDonald, Evelyn Selbie and Fred Kohler. The film was released on October 17, 1926, by Fox Film Corporation.

Cast     
 Olive Borden as Valencia
 Ralph Graves as Roger McKay
 Gertrude Astor as Mrs. Andrews
 J. Farrell MacDonald as Sgt Cassidy
 Evelyn Selbie as Martha Leseur
 Fred Kohler as Joe Leseur
 Lawford Davidson as Henry Harland
 Alfred Fisher as Father John
 Lottie Williams as Valencia's Maid

References

External links
 

1926 films
1926 Western (genre) films
American black-and-white films
American silent feature films
Films based on American novels
Films based on novels by James Oliver Curwood
Films directed by Irving Cummings
Fox Film films
Northern (genre) films
Royal Canadian Mounted Police in fiction
Silent American Western (genre) films
1920s American films
1920s English-language films